The Maui Rugby Club are an American rugby union and rugby league team based in Maui, Hawaii.

Notable players 
Sione Taufa- United States national rugby league team rugby league international player
Vaka Manupuna- United States national rugby league team rugby league international playerhttp://

References

External links 
Maui Rugby Website

American rugby league teams
American rugby union teams
Sports in Maui
Rugby clubs established in 2010
Rugby union in Hawaii
2010 establishments in Hawaii